Gayatri Reddy (born 21 September 1986) is known primarily as the face and owner of the now-defunct Deccan Chargers in the Indian Premier League. She is the daughter of T Venkattram Reddy, owner of the Deccan Chronicle.

When the Indian Premier League started in 2008, Gayatri helped her father build the Deccan Chargers team. She picked players for the team, and became a constant presence at the team's games, "adding a refreshing dose of glamour," according to one writer for India Today.

Gayatri Reddy studied at University College London, where she received a B.Sc. honours in construction management. As of 2013, she is a features editor for the Deccan Chronicle newspaper. She writes on "travel, fashion, sports and cuisine, and interviews celebrities."

References

External links
 
 Gayatri Reddy collected news and commentary at The Times of India

1986 births
Living people
Writers from Hyderabad, India
Indian Premier League franchise owners
Indian women journalists
Indian socialites
Alumni of University College London